This is a list of nicknames and pseudonyms of Nazis.  Common nicknames (as translated into English) include variations of "Beast", "Butcher" and "Angel of Death".  Most high-ranking Nazis did not have a nickname.  Most of the notable Nazis who did have nicknames were concentration camp personnel.

The common nickname of Sepp in German for Josef, for such Nazis as Josef Dietrich and Josef Oberhauser, is excluded from this list.  The definite article "the" has been removed from the nicknames for the purposes of sorting properly.

Nicknames

Pseudonyms
Some Nazis also used pseudonyms, in most cases to evade notice and capture after the war.

References

Sources
 

 
 
 
 
 
 

Nicknames
Nazis
Nazis
Nazis